This list of tallest buildings in Jersey City ranks skyscrapers and high-rises in the U.S. city of Jersey City, New Jersey by height. It is currently the tallest building in New Jersey and 45th tallest building in the United States. The 42-story 30 Hudson Street, known widely as the "Goldman Sachs Tower", which rises  and was completed in 2004 is the second tallest building in Jersey City. It is currently the 81st-tallest building in the United States, and the second tallest building in the state of New Jersey. Nine of the ten tallest buildings in New Jersey are located in Jersey City.

The building, now known as "26 Journal Square", was added to the National Register of Historic Places in 1984. Jersey City went through a relatively small building boom in the late 1980s and early 1990s, and then entered a larger period of commercial and residential high-rise construction in the late 1990s. This second boom has resulted in the construction of many of the city's tallest buildings, including 30 Hudson Street and the Harborside Financial Center development. The construction boom has continued to the present. , there are 122 completed high-rises in the city. Forty three completed buildings stand at least  in height. 



Tallest buildings 

This includes spires and architectural details but does not include antenna masts. An equal sign (=) following a rank indicates the same height between two or more buildings. The "Year" column indicates the year in which a building was completed.

Tallest under construction, approved and proposed

Under construction 
Buildings that are under construction in Jersey City and are planned to rise at least .

Approved 
Buildings that are approved in Jersey City and are planned to rise at least .

Timeline of tallest buildings 

This lists buildings that once held the title of tallest building in Jersey City.

See also 

 Hudson Waterfront
 List of tallest buildings in Fort Lee
 List of tallest buildings in North Hudson
 List of tallest buildings in Newark
 List of tallest buildings in New Jersey
 List of tallest buildings in New York City

Notes 
A. Top US cities with completed buildings at least  : New York City (Northeast) has 304, Chicago has 134, Miami has 58, Houston has 40, Los Angeles has 26, San Francisco has 26, Boston (Northeast) has 23, Seattle has 22, Dallas has 21, and Jersey City (Northeast) has 17 (ranked 79th in the world).
B. ^ This number is an estimate, as an exact height for this building has never been released by the developer.
C. This building was originally known as the Labor Bank Building, but has since been renamed 26 Journal Square.

References 
General
 Emporis.com - Jersey City
Specific

External links 
 Diagram of Jersey City skyscrapers on SkyscraperPage
 Tower becomes tallest residential building in N.J.

Articles containing image maps
 
Jersey City
Architecture in New Jersey
Jersey City
Towers in New Jersey